The Zenos E10 is a mid-engined sports car designed and produced by the British manufacturer Zenos Cars. First announced to the press in September 2013, pre-production car was made available to the press in October 2014.

Production started in Norfolk in January 2015, and ceased at the end of 2016 when the company fell into administration at the start of 2017. The ‘E’ in the car's name is taken from managing director and co-founder Mark Edwards’ surname, while the ‘10’ signifies that this is the 10th car project he has been involved in.

In September 2016, the company announced that it had built its 100th vehicle, which was an E10 R.

Zenos E10 

The car features an aluminium 'spine' to which a composite passenger ‘tub’ and front and rear subframes are attached. The ‘spine’ is believed to be the largest single aluminium extrusion used in any road car, with a torsional stiffness in excess of 10,000 Nm/degree.

The composite ‘tub’ of the E10 is formed of a ‘sandwich’ that comprises a thermoset plastic core contained between sheets of carbon fibre. The latter utilise pieces of carbon fibre that have been discarded in other processes. It is estimated that the resulting material delivers 70% of the mechanical performance of ‘virgin’ carbon fibre at significantly lower cost.

The cabin has been designed to accommodate people from 1.55 m (5 ft 1 in) tall to 1.91 m (6 ft 3 in) tall. The interior also incorporates an additional central screen, allowing the passenger to view information that would normally only be visible to the driver.

The car features inboard front springs and dampers and replaceable GRP body panels, which are intended to reduce repair costs in the event of an accident.

Zenos E10 S 

Production began at the same time as for the E10.

The E10 S accelerates from 0 to 60 mph (0–97 km/h) in 4.0 seconds, and can reach 145 mph (233 km/h).

The upgrade kit can be fitted to new or used cars and includes new air intake, modified intercooler and remapped ECU.

Zenos E10 R 

The E10 R has uniquely tuned suspension and brakes, and the dry vehicle weight of  has been helped by wheels that are each  lighter than those fitted to the E10 S.

The car can accelerate from zero to 97 km/h (60 mph) in as little as 3.0 seconds, and reach a top speed of 249 km/h (155 mph). Standard equipment levels are higher than those of the E10 and E10 S, and include six-speed manual gearbox, ventilated disc brakes and uprated four-pot callipers, and twin-skin composite seats with four-point racing harnesses.

References

External links
 

Coupés
Roadsters
Sports cars
Cars introduced in 2013
Rear mid-engine, rear-wheel-drive vehicles